Lincoln Birch (born 27 October 1978) is a professional golfer.

Professional career
Birch turned pro in 2001, initially representing England. He represented Germany from 2004 after obtaining dual nationality. He played on the Challenge Tour from 2001 to 2007. He played on the European Tour between 2001 and 2008, the Sunshine Tour between 2001 and 2003, as well as 2010 and 2012. He also periodically played on lower-level local tours such as the Gateway Tour, EPD Tour, ECCO Tour and MENA Tour respectfully.

Amateur to Professional transition
Birch transitioned from amateur golf into the pro ranks after a foray of playing PGA Tour and Buy.com Tour Monday Qualifying for various events in the 2000 and 2001 seasons, respectfully. He played the 2001 PGA Tour Nissan Open via the qualifier and a 5-way playoff for 1 spot at GC Los Serranos. He proceeded to make the cut at Riviera and tied the eventual tournament winner (Robert Allenby) for birdies made during the tournament (18) and ranked high in overall driving performance. A few weeks later he played the 2001 Buy.com Gainesville Open by virtue of qualifying at the Florida State Gators facility. He missed the cut at the main event by 1 stroke. Overall Birch participated in 10 Monday Qualifiers (x4 in ‘00; x6 in ‘01) making 2 successfully.

Starting on tour
Birch initially joined the European Tour in 2001 after competing in The Open at Royal Lytham & St. Annes by virtue of successfully navigating regional (Copt Heath GC; playoff) and final qualifying (Southport & Ainsdale GC) rounds. He made his first regular European Tour appearance at the 2001 Cannes Open. The same season he played on the 2001–02 Sunshine Tour, ending the season 64th on the order of merit and qualified for the Tour Championship. Subsequently he gained starts at the Kenya Open and the Zambia Open that led to success on the 2002 Challenge Tour season. Birch gained full playing rights for the 2003 European Tour season by finishing 11th in the 2002 European Challenge Tour order of merit.

Personal life
Birch, born in UK, lived and was educated in Germany from age 11. Bilingual, consequently taking up dual nationality in 2004. Birch lived in Germany until 2011, a total 21 years. In 2014 Birch changed his name during transition out of active professional sport. Birch moved to the UK in 2016 and resides in the West Midlands, England.

Health
Birch experienced injury and health difficulties that would cost him time and consistency of performance from ‘99 onwards. Diagnosed with ankylosing spondylitis (AS) with the genetic autoimmune inflammatory disposition HLA-B27 in 2006. AS was the reason of retiring from competition. Birch was diagnosed autistic in 2019.

Amateur wins
1997 Belgian U21 International, Spanish U21 International
1998 Polish International, Swiss International
1999 National Club Team Champions with GLC Berlin- Wannsee

Professional wins
2011 Hamburg PGA Championship

Professional status
Birch stepped back from playing competitively after the 2012 Sunshine Tour season concluded.
His PGA playing-membership status expired in 2016 after not competing for a period of more than 2 years. Birch joined the PGA GB&I trainee program in 2019. Birch graduated the FdSc Professional Golf Studies course at University of Birmingham in June 2022.
Birch is due to graduate the BSc Professional Golf Studies top up course in 2024.

References

External links

Lincoln Birch at the MENA Golf Tour official site
Lincoln Birch  at the Twitter official site
Lincoln Birch  at the Instagram official site

English male golfers
European Tour golfers
Sunshine Tour golfers
Sportspeople from Wolverhampton
Sportspeople from Shrewsbury
1978 births
Living people